Leroy S. Bendheim (February 12, 1906 – June 18, 1987) was a two-term mayor of Alexandria, Virginia and three-term Virginia state senator.

Family and early life
Bendheim was born in Alexandria, the son of Charles Bendheim and Elizabeth Schwarz. His father was a member of the Alexandria City Council and a member of the Virginia House of Delegates.  He graduated from law school at George Washington University in 1929.

Political career
Bendheim served on the Alexandria School Board from 1934 to 1943, and was chairman for five years. Elected to the City Council as a Democrat, he served from 1948 to 1955; he received the most votes for the at-large council and, thus, was vice mayor from 1952 to 1955. In 1955, he was elected Mayor of Alexandria and served two three-year terms as mayor before his defeat in 1961 by fellow Democrat Frank E. Mann.

In 1963, Bendheim was elected to the Virginia Senate, representing Alexandria and served there 12 years. In 1975, he was defeated in a bid for a fourth term by Republican Wiley F. Mitchell. Bendheim never served in elected office again.

Death
Bendheim died on June 18, 1987 of cancer at Alexandria Hospital in Alexandria, Virginia.

References

1906 births
1987 deaths
Mayors of Alexandria, Virginia
Virginia city council members
Democratic Party Virginia state senators
George Washington University Law School alumni
Deaths from cancer in Virginia
20th-century American politicians
Lawyers from Alexandria, Virginia